The economy of Ukraine is an emerging, lower-middle income,  mixed economy located in Eastern Europe. It grew rapidly from 2000 until 2008 when the Great Recession began worldwide and reached Ukraine. The economy recovered in 2010 and continued improving until 2013. From 2014 to 2015, the Ukrainian economy suffered a severe downturn, with GDP in 2015 being slightly above half of its value in 2013. In 2016, the economy again started to grow. By 2018, the Ukrainian economy was growing rapidly, and reached almost 80% of its size in 2008.

The depression during the 1990s included hyperinflation and a fall in economic output to less than half of the GDP of the preceding Ukrainian SSR. GDP growth was recorded for the first time in 2000, and continued for eight years. This growth was halted by the global financial crisis of 2008. The Ukrainian economy recovered and achieved positive GDP growth in the first quarter of 2010. In the early 2010s, Ukraine was noted as possessing many of the components of a 'major European economy': rich farmlands, a well-developed industrial base, highly trained labour, and a good education system. It also has important mineral resources.

In October 2013, the Ukrainian economy lapsed into a recession. The previous summer, Ukrainian exports to Russia substantially declined due to stricter border and customs control by Russia. The early 2014 annexation of Crimea by Russia, and the war in Donbas that started in the spring of 2014 severely damaged Ukraine's economy and severely damaged two of Ukraine's most industrial regions. In 2013, Ukraine saw zero GDP growth. Ukraine's economy shrank by 6.8% in 2014, and this continued with a 12% decline in GDP in 2015. In April 2017, the World Bank stated that Ukraine's economic growth rate was 2.3% in 2016, ending the recession. Despite these improvements, Ukraine remains the poorest country in Europe, which some have attributed to high corruption levels and the slow pace of economic liberalization and institutional reform.

In April 2020, the World Bank reported that economic growth was solid at 3.2 percent in 2019, led by a good agricultural harvest and sectors dependent on domestic consumption. Household consumption grew by 11.9 percent in 2019, supported by sizable remittance inflows and a resumption of consumer lending, while domestic trade and agriculture grew by 3.4 and 1.3 percent, respectively. In 2020 GDP fell by 4.4 percent due to the COVID-19 pandemic. Due to the 2022 Russian invasion of Ukraine, the country's economy could shrink up to 35%, according to the International Monetary Fund.

History

Before 1917 
Geography has long influenced the economy of the Ukrainian lands. Rich fertile soils (such as chernozem areas) made the area a "breadbasket": for ancient Greece as well as for early modern Europe. The maintenance of trade corridors – the route from the Varangians to the Greeks and access through the Straits to the Mediterranean world – became important. Mineral resources encouraged industrialisation – notably in the Donbas – from the 19th century onwards.

The lack of secure borders meant repeated interruptions in economic development. Steppe nomads and other conquerors – Cumans, Mongols, Tatars for example, sometimes saw plundering as more important than fostering economic development. In the 16th to 18th centuries, the wastelands of the Wild Fields left much of Ukraine as an area of tentatively militarised outposts, prior to tsarist Russia's extension of its power into the region in the 17th and 18th centuries.

Soviet period: 1917 to 1991

1991 to 2000
On 24 August 1991, Ukraine established its independence from the Soviet Union. The new state's economy suffered huge output declines and soaring inflation in the following years. Ukraine saw hyperinflation in the early 1990s because of a lack of access to financial markets and massive monetary expansion to finance government spending, while output declined sharply. Huge output declines and soaring inflation was at the time common to most former Soviet republics, but Ukraine was among the hardest hit by these problems.

In response to this hyperinflation the National Bank of Ukraine replaced the national currency, the karbovanets, with the hryvnia in September 1996 and pledged to keep it stable in relation to the US dollar. The currency remained unstable through the late 1990s, particularly during the 1998 Russian financial crisis.

Deep recession during the 1990s led to a relatively high poverty rate, but beginning in 2001, seven straight years of economic growth, raised the living standard for most citizens. A World Bank report in 2007 noted: "Ukraine recorded one of the sharpest declines in poverty of any transition economy in recent years. The poverty rate, measured against an absolute poverty line, fell from a high of 32% in 2001 to 8% in 2005." The UN noted that Ukraine had overcome absolute poverty, and that there was only relative poverty in 2009.

2000 to 2014

Ukraine stabilised by the early 2000s. The year 2000 saw the first year of economic growth since Ukraine's independence. The economy continued to grow thanks to a 50% growth in exports between 2000 and 2008 – mainly exports from the traditional industries of metals, metallurgy, engineering, chemicals, and food. Between 2001 and 2008, metals and chemicals prices boomed because of fast international economic growth, while the price of natural gas imported from Russia remained low.

Monetization also helped to drive the economic boom Ukraine experienced between 2000 and 2008. Attracted in part by relatively high interest-rates, foreign cash was injected into Ukraine's economy and money supply grew rapidly: from 2001 to 2010 broad, money increased at an annual rate of 35%. In 2006 and 2007, credit growth averaged 73%.

An effect of this was that Ukrainian assets began to look like a large economic bubble and high inflation started to damage Ukraine's export competitiveness. The ratio of credit to GDP grew extremely fast – from 7 to almost 80 percent over just several years. From 2000 to 2007, Ukraine's real growth averaged 7.4%. This growth was driven by domestic demand: orientation toward consumption, other structural change, and financial development.

Domestic demand grew in constant prices by almost 15% annually. It was supported by expansionary—procyclical—fiscal policy. Ukraine benefited from very low labor costs, slightly lower tariffs, and high prices of its main export goods, but at the same time faced notably higher non-tariff barriers. Russia has not charged Ukraine below-world-market prices for natural gas since the end of 2008. This led to various Russia–Ukraine gas disputes.

Ukraine suffered severely in the economic crisis of 2008. Because of it Ukraine experienced a drought in capital flows. The hryvnia, which had been pegged at a rate of 5:1 to the U.S. dollar, was devalued to 8:1, and was stabilized at that ratio until the beginning of 2014. In 2008, Ukraine's economy ranked 45th in the world according to 2008 GDP (nominal), with a total nominal GDP of US$188 billion, and nominal per-capita GDP of US$3,900. There was 3% unemployment at the end of 2008. Over the first 9 months of 2009, unemployment averaged 9.4%. The final official unemployment rates for 2009 and 2010 were 8.8% and 8.4%, although the CIA World Factbook notes a "large number of unregistered or underemployed workers". Ukraine's GDP fell by 15% in 2009.

The Ukrainian economy recovered in the first quarter of 2010 due to the recovery of the world economy and increasing prices for metals. Ukraine's real GDP growth in 2010 was 4.3%, leading to a per-capita PPP GDP of US$6,700. In 2011, Ukrainian politicians estimated that 40% of Ukraine's economy is a shadow economy.

In the summer of 2013, Ukrainian exports to Russia fell substantially due to Russia's stricter customs controls.

By October 2013, the Ukrainian economy had become stuck in recession. Moody's downgraded Ukraine's credit rating to Caa1 (poor quality and very high credit risk) in September 2013. At the time, swap markets rated Ukraine's default probability over the next five years at 50 percent. In 2013, Ukraine saw no growth in GDP.

After Euromaidan: 2014 to present 

Due to the loss of Ukraine's largest trading partner, Russia, over the annexation of Crimea in March 2014, and exacerbated by the war in Donbas which started in April 2014 Ukraine's economy shrank by 6.8% in 2014. It had been expected to decline by 8%. A Ukrainian government report stated early in February 2016 that Ukraine's economy had shrunk by 10.4% in 2015. For 2015, the National Bank of Ukraine had expected a further decline of 11.6%, and the World Bank anticipated a 12% shrinkage. The World Bank forecast growth of 1% in 2016.

Early in February 2014, the National Bank of Ukraine changed the hryvnia into a fluctuating/floating currency in an attempt to meet IMF requirements and to try to enforce a stable price for the currency in the Forex market. In 2014 and 2015, the hryvnia lost about 70% of its value against the U.S. dollar.

The IMF agreed to a four-year loan program worth about $17.5 billion in eight tranches over 2015 and 2016, subject to conditions which involved economic reforms. However, due to lack of progress on reforms, only two tranches worth $6.7 billion were paid in 2015. A third tranche of $1.7 billion was provisionally scheduled in June 2016 subject to the bringing into law of 19 further reform measures. Some western analysts believe that large foreign loans are not encouraging reform, but enabling the corrupt extraction of funds out of the country.

Since December 2015, Ukraine has refused to pay and hence de facto defaults on a $3 billion debt payment to Russia that formed part of a December 2013 Ukrainian–Russian action plan.

The turnover of retail trade in Ukraine in 2014 shrank by 8.6% (from 2013) and shrank by 20.7% in 2015 (from 2014). Ukraine saw a 30.9% decline in exports in 2015, mainly because of a sharp decline in production output in Donetsk Oblast and in Luhansk Oblast (the two regions of Donbas). These two regions were responsible for 40.6% of the total export-decline rate. Before the war they had been two of the more industrial oblasts of Ukraine.

According to the Ministry of Economic Development and Trade, Ukraine had a surplus in its balance of payments in January–November 2015 of $566 million and has had a trade deficit of $11.046 billion during the same period in 2014. On 31 December 2015, Ukraine's public debt stood at 79% of its GDP. It had shrank $4.324 billion in 2015 to end up at $65.488 billion. But calculated in hryvnia, the debt had grown by 42.78%. In 2015, the Ministry of Social Policy of Ukraine rated 20–25% of Ukrainian households as poor.

$2.526 billion entered the Ukrainian economy via remittances in 2015, 34.9% less than in 2014. $431 million was sent from Ukraine to elsewhere using remittances. In January 2016, Bloomberg rated Ukraine's economy as the 41st most innovative in the world, down from 33rd in January 2015.

In May 2016, the IMF mission chief for Ukraine, Ron van Rood, stated that the reduction of corruption was a key test for continued international support. In 2015 Transparency International ranked Ukraine 130th out of 168 countries in its Corruption Perceptions Index. In February 2016, historian Andrew Wilson assessed progress in reducing corruption as poor as of 2016. Aivaras Abromavičius, Ukraine's then-Minister of Economy and Trade, resigned in February 2016, citing ingrained corruption. In October, at a conference for foreign investors, corruption and lack of trust in the judiciary were identified as the largest obstacles to investment.

Late in July 2016, the State Statistics Service of Ukraine reported that, compared with June 2015, real wages had increased by 17.3%. Simultaneously the National Bank of Ukraine reported a $406 million surplus in Ukraine's January–June 2016 balance of payments against a deficit of $1.3 billion in the same period in 2015. According to Ukraine's State Statistics Service, inflation in 2016 came down to 13.9%; while it had stood at 43.3% in 2015 and at 24.9% in 2014.

The Economist has compared the severity of Ukraine's recession to that of the Greek recession in 2011–2012 – pointing to Ukraine experiencing an 8–9% decline in GDP from 2014 to 2015 and Greece experiencing an 8.1% decline of GDP in 2011–2012, and noted that not all areas of Ukraine were equally effected by the economic downturn. Donetsk and Luhansk (the conflict zone) saw industrial production falling by 32% and 42% respectively. On the other hand, Lviv, located over 1000 km from the conflict, posted the largest jump in employment in the nation.

The economy of Ukraine has overcome the severe crisis caused by armed conflict in the eastern part of country. A 200% devaluation of the hryvnia in 2014–2015 made Ukrainian goods and services cheaper and more competitive. In 2016, for the first time since 2010, the economy grew by more than 2%. A 2017 World Bank statement projected growth of 2% in 2017, of 3.5% in 2018 and of 4% in 2019 and 2020. Inflation in Ukraine in 2017 was 13.7% (12.4% in 2016).

Since about 2015, there has been a growing number of Ukrainians working in the European Union, particularly Poland. Eurostat reported that 662,000 Ukrainians received EU residence permits in 2017, with 585,439 issued by Poland. The head of the National Security and Defense Council of Ukraine has estimated that up to 9 million Ukrainians work abroad for some part of the year, and 3.2 million have regular full-time work abroad with most not planning to return. World Bank statistics show that money remittances back to Ukraine have roughly doubled from 2015 to 2018, worth about 4% of GDP.

In Q1 2019, China became Ukraine's largest trading partner, replacing Russia. In Q3 2019 real GDP grew by 4.2%. The main driving factors include: increased purchasing power of the population in conditions of increase of the level of wages (during nine months of 2019 real wages increased by 9.5%); high level of business activity and preservation of investment activity, which stimulated mainly the development of construction, in particular, of industrial and transport infrastructure facilities; active consumer lending; maintaining the high dynamics of agricultural development; favorable price situation on selected world commodity markets for domestic exports and others.
Ukraine made its largest payment on debt in 2019 at $1.1 billion.

In 2019, Fitch Ratings, a global leader in credit ratings and research, upgraded Ukraine's Long-Term  foreign and National Currency Issuer Default Ratings (IDR) from "B−" to "B" and improved the outlook on the credit rating from stable to positive. Ukraine has demonstrated timely access to fiscal and external financing, improving macroeconomic stability and declining public indebtedness.

Ukraine moved up seven positions in the annual World Bank Doing Business 2020 report. Prudent macroeconomic management helped reduce inflation and interest rates in 2019. Inflation eased to 4.1 percent at the end of 2019 and 2.4 percent in February 2020.

On 27 October 2020, the Constitutional Court of Ukraine ruled that anti-corruption legislation, including the mandatory electronic declaration of income, was unconstitutional. President Zelensky warned that if parliament did not restore these anti-corruption laws, foreign aid, loans and visa-free travel to the European Union were at risk. The Governor of the National Bank of Ukraine reported that Ukraine will not receive the scheduled $700 million IMF load before the end of 2020 because of the issue. IMF assessment teams had not visited Kyiv for eight months, which is necessary for further IMF loan tranches to be released. In February 2021, economist Anders Åslund wrote "for months, senior Ukrainian officials have been claiming that the Ukrainian government has done everything the [IMF] could possibly demand" but "this happy talk was always detached from reality", and the relationship with the IMF remains critical.

On 21 July 2022, Ukraine devalued the Ukrainian hryvnia by 25% against the U.S. dollar due to the economic impact of the war, to eliminate currency speculation and to improve the international competitiveness of business. The previous day it requested a two-year payment freeze on international bonds; in 2020 it had $130 billion of external debt. At that time the economy was expected to contract by roughly 40% in 2022.

Economic data
Ukraine is subdivided into nine economic regions: Carpathian, Northwestern, Podillia, Capital, Central-Ukrainian, Northeastern, Black-Sea-Coastal, Trans-Dnipro, and Donetsk. Those regions were redrawn from the three Soviet economic regions of the Ukrainian SSR: Donetsk-TransDnieper, Southwestern, and Southern.

Main economic indicators 
The following table shows the main economic indicators in 1992–2020. Inflation below 5% is in green.

Trade

Until recently, Russia was Ukraine's largest trading partner with 25.7% of exports and 32.4% of imports in 2012. In 2012, 24.9% of exports and 30.9% of imports were to and from the EU. In 2013, 35.9% of Ukrainian exports went to CIS countries, including eight countries other than Ukraine. Simultaneously, exports to EU countries was 26.6% of all exports.

In 2015 the EU became Ukraine's largest trading partner, accounting for more than a third of its trade. In 2015, Ukrainian exports to Russia had fallen to 12.7%. In 2017, 14.5% of Ukraine's imports came from Russia. In 2017, Ukrainian exports to Russia stood at 9%. In 2017, 40% of Ukraine's exports went to the EU and 15% to CIS countries. Overall Ukraine increased its exports by 20% in 2017. The growth of imports was faster than the rate of export growth.

In 2015, food and other agricultural products (worth $13 billion), metallurgy ($8.8 billion) and machinery ($4.1 billion) made up most of Ukraine's exports, with trade partners in 217 countries. Exports from Ukraine in 2015 decreased by 29.3% to $38.135 billion. Imports were 31.1% down, to $37.502 billion. In 2017 almost half of Ukraine's exports were provided by the agrarian complex and food industry, slightly more than 20% by metallurgy and nearly 10% by machine building products.

In 2019, China replaced Russia as the largest single-nation trading partner with Ukraine achieved $50.06 billion in  export and $60.78 billion in import. Ukraine was the leading agricultural goods provider in the Chinese market.

Natural gas is Ukraine's biggest import and the main cause of the country's structural trade deficit.

Exports of Ukrainian goods in 2021 have reached a record US$68.24 billion.

List of major private owned companies, not considering banks and insurance companies

Source:

The 2016 Ranking of the Top 500 companies of Central and Eastern Europe by Deloitte has come up with specific features of Ukraine’s economy. More than 50% of the biggest Ukrainian companies are therefore owned by local investors whereas for the whole region this number accounts only to 15,4%. Deloitte explains the difference with the low investment attractiveness for foreign investors. Furthermore, the biggest Ukrainian companies feature a considerable higher average headcount (35’600 vs. 6’600 employees) and lower productivity (EUR 47’000 revenue per employee vs. EUR 207’000 for the whole region).

Natural resources

Ukraine is relatively rich in natural resources, particularly in mineral deposits. Although oil and natural gas reserves in Ukraine are largely exhausted, it has other important energy sources, such as coal, hydroelectricity and nuclear-fuel raw materials.

Ukrainian economy in graphics

Sectors

Industries

Ukraine is home to companies operating in around 20 major industries, namely power generation, fuel, ferrous and non-ferrous metallurgy, chemical and petrochemical and gas, machine building and metal-working, forest, wood-working and wood pulp and paper, construction materials, light, food and others. Industry accounted for 26% of GDP in 2012. Ukraine has a massive high-tech industrial base, including electronics, arms industry and space program.

Mining and production 
Ukraine is one of the world's most important mineral producing countries, in terms of both the range and size of its reserves. There are nearly 8,000 separate deposits, harboring some 90 different minerals, of which about 20 are economically significant. About half of all the known deposits are under exploitation. Coal reserves in Ukraine amount to 47.1 billion tons. The annual domestic demand for coal as fuel is about 100 million tons, of which 85 percent can be satisfied by domestic production.

Ukraine has oil and gas fields that meet 10 percent of her oil and 20 percent of her gas consumption, respectively. Deposits of iron ore (estimated at 28 billion tons), manganese ore (3 billion tons), chalk and limestone (1.5 billion tons) are also large in Ukraine. The domestic industrial sector suffers from constant energy shortages and energy supply payment debts totaling about $792 million at the end of 1995.

In 2019, Ukraine was the 7th largest world producer of iron ore, the world's 8th largest producer of manganese, 6th largest producer of titanium, and 7th largest producer worldwide of graphite. Ukraine was the world's 9th largest producer of uranium in 2018. 
Ukraine supplies about 50% of the world's neon gas and 40% of its krypton, both of which are needed for the production of semiconductors. It is estimated that over 90% of U.S. semiconductor-grade neon supplies are imported from Ukraine.

Iron and steel 

Ukraine is rich in mineral deposits, including iron ore (of which it once produced 50 percent of the entire Soviet output), manganese ore (of which it produced 40 percent of world output during the Soviet era), mercury, titanium, and nickel.

Ukraine has a major ferrous metal industry, producing cast iron, steel and pipes. Among its economy leading companies in that field are Metinvest, Kryvorizhstal, AzovStal, Ilyich Steel & Iron Works, and others. As of 2012, Ukraine is the world's tenth largest steel producer (according to the World Steel Association).

Chemical industry
Another important branch is the country's chemical industry which includes the production of coke, mineral fertilizers and sulfuric acid.

Defense industry

Ukraine's defense industry is organized around Ukroboronprom, a state owned conglomerate of over 130 companies. These companies include Soviet era giants such as Ivchenko-Progress aircraft design bureau that was opened in 1945, to newer companies such as RPC Fort which came into existence in the 1990s. Ukraine is among the top 10 arms exporters in the world.

The signing of recent large contracts may put Ukraine into 6th place among biggest arms traders, after the United States, Russian Federation, France, Germany and Israel. The output of Ukrainian defense plants grew 58% in 2009, with largest growth reported by aircraft builders (77%) and ship builders (71%).

In 2013, Ukraine's defense sector manufactured a total of 11.7 billion UAH worth of goods, 10 billion UAH of which were exported. In the first 9 months of 2014 Ukraine's defense sector produced a record 13 billion UAH worth of goods. The increase was largely due to government orders for the war in Donbas.

Fuel and energy complex
Due to Ukraine's large population and its significant energy consumption, it is one of the largest energy markets on the European continent. Ukraine's location at the intersection of Europe, Russia, the Black Sea, and Caspian Sea provides its ample natural resources such as coal, oil, natural gas, as well as significant potential for hydro and biomass energy.

Ukraine relies heavily on imports for natural gas and oil products. It is a key transit site for European imports of Russian gas. Ukraine transits more natural gas than any other country. Prior to the full-scale Russian invasion of Ukraine in 2022, economic crises, Russia's closure of its market, and the escalating Russo-Ukrainian conflict in eastern Ukraine since 2014 had stymied some of the country's growth. Ukraine's energy policy has created incentives for investment in renewable energy sources, but these remain uncertain. Since 2015, Ukrainian energy policy has favored reducing natural gas subsidies alongside diversifying energy supply. Ukraine participates in the European Union's EU4Energy Programme, an effort to promote evidence-based policy making in national energy sectors.

Fuel industry 
Ukraine remains heavily reliant on oil product and gas imports. Russia ranks as Ukraine's principal supplier of oil, and Russian firms own and/or operate the majority of Ukraine's refining capacity. Natural gas imports come from Russia – which delivers its own gas, as well as the gas from Turkmenistan.

Ukraine has been a key transit point for EU imports of Russian gas, and its pipeline system has been a crucial player in European energy supply, despite recent diversification of transit routes by Russian oil companies such as Gazprom. Since the 2014 Russia–Ukraine gas disputes, the latter's dependence on Russian gas supplies has dramatically affected its economics and foreign policy.

Ukraine is independent in its electricity supply, and exports electricity to Russia and other countries of Eastern Europe.  This is achieved through a wide use of nuclear power and hydroelectricity.  Recent energy strategy intends a gradual decreasing of gas- and oil-based generation in favor of nuclear power, as well as energy saving measures including lower industrial gas consumption.  Reform of the still inefficient and opaque energy sector is a major objective of the International Monetary Fund (IMF) and World Bank programs with Ukraine.

Ukraine was a partner country of the European Union's INOGATE energy programme, which had four key topics: enhancing energy security, convergence of member state energy markets on the basis of EU internal energy market principles, supporting sustainable energy development, and attracting investment for energy projects of common and regional interest. INOGATE was discontinued in 2016.

Automotive industry

Ukraine automobile manufacturers produces diesel locomotives, tractors, trucks, buses, trolleybuses, own-designed cars and trams. There are 12 automobile manufacturers in Ukraine, including ZAZ, LuAZ, Bogdan, KrAZ, Eurocar, Electron, and LAZ.

ZAZ (Zaporizhzhia Automobile Building Plant) is the main automobile-manufacturer of Ukraine, based in the south-eastern city of Zaporizhzhia. Passenger car manufacturing in Ukraine started in 1959. From 1960 to 1994, a total of 3,422,444 Zaporozhets vehicles were manufactured in Zaporizhzhia and engines with air-cooling in Melitopol. In 2011–2012, the Zaporizhzhia Automobile Building Plant started serial full-scale production of two new models of vehicle, the ZAZ Forza (a re-badged Chinese Chery A13) and the ZAZ Vida (a re-badged Daewoo Aveo).

The Bogdan Corporation is a leading Ukrainian automobile-manufacturing group, including several car- and bus-makers of Ukraine. Bogdan buses (re-badged Isuzu models) are used as the primary small buses in most Ukrainian cities.

LAZ is one of the major bus manufacturers in Ukraine. It manufactures city buses, coach buses, trolley buses, and special purpose buses.

The Lviv-based company Electrontrans is an enterprise of a full-scale production, specializing in design and production of modern urban electric transport – trams, trolleybuses, electric buses, units and spare parts. In 2013 Electrotrans starts producing low-floor trams, the first Ukrainian 100% low-floor tramways.

Aircraft and aerospace industry 

Ukraine is one of nine countries with a full cycle of aerospace hardware engineering and production. Besides the design and production of passenger and transportation aircraft, Ukraine has a network of aircraft repair enterprises, including companies involved in the recovery of military planes and helicopters. In March 2007, the Cabinet of Ministers of Ukraine created State aircraft building concern «Aviation of Ukraine» (SACAU), which is governed by the Ministry of industrial policy. Production of An-148 aircraft is now one of the most prospective projects for the Ukrainian plane manufacturing industry with 35 units manufactured since 2009 (together with Russian production).

The aircraft were engineered by the Antonov Scientific and Production Complex Design Office (Antonov ANTK).  The largest single airplane in the world, Antonov An-225 Mriya was designed by Antonov ANTK and made in 1988.  The gross production of light and ultra light planes in Ukraine does not exceed 200 units per annum.  Production of hang-gliders and paragliders of all designs makes nearly 1,000 units each year. Most of produced devices are exported. The main buyers of Ukrainian-made ultra-light aircraft are the United States, Australia, New Zealand, the United Kingdom, France, etc..

Since 2014, aerospace industry revenues have fallen by 80%. In June 2016, the Antonov Corporation merged with the state-owned military conglomerate UkrOboronProm, forming Ukrainian Aircraft Corporation within its structure. This merger was done to boost Antonov profits and the production rate. Currently, Antonov is working on two cargo planes: An-178, a cargo version of the An-158, and the An-132D, a redesigned version of the An-32. The An-132 is developed jointly with Saudi's Taqnia Aeronautics Company, featuring western avionics and engines. The roll out and first flight is due at the beginning of January 2017.

The space rocket industry in Ukraine has been managed by the National Space Agency of Ukraine since 1992. The agency includes 30 enterprises, scientific research institutes, and design offices. Pivdenne Design Bureau is in general responsible for creating the Zenit-3SL carrier rocket. The National Space Agency of Ukraine is involved in cooperation with American Rockwell Int., as well as the Sea Launch project. The first stage core of the U.S. Orbital ATK Antares rocket was designed and is manufactured in Ukraine by Yuzhnoye SDO.

Shipbuilding

Ukraine is one of the 10 largest shipbuilding countries in Europe. There are 49 shipbuilding companies registered in Ukraine. They are able to build a wide range of vessel types: powerboats, barges, bulk carriers (dry cargo ship), tankers, liquefied gas carriers, etc.

The USSR's collapse put Ukraine's shipbuilding into a long-term decline. This lasted until 1999 and was mostly due to a minimum volume of state shipbuilding orders. Between 1992 and 2003, Ukraine's 11 shipyards produced 237 navigation units for a total value of US$1.5 billion. Production facilities are not working near full capacity, and customers are not always timely in paying for services. The shipbuilding industry grew between 2000–2006, in line with the wider Ukrainian economic expansion at the time.

State support and the opening of free economic zones, foremost at enterprises based in Mykolaiv were a crucial recent development in Ukraine's shipbuilding industry. Within the Mykolaiv Special Economic Zone, enterprises like Damen Shipyards Okean, Chornomorskyi (Black Sea) Shipbuilding Plant, 61 Communards Shipbuilding Plant, as well as the Veselka (Rainbow) paint and insulation enterprise are implementing investment projects targeted to raise efficiency and quality in primarily export-oriented vessels through production upgrades. The new engineering developments and high potential of Ukrainian designers provide the ability to build high quality vessels with competitive prices.

Agriculture

Although typically known as the industrial base of the Soviet Union, agriculture is a large part of Ukraine's economy. Ukraine is one of the world's largest agricultural producers and exporters and is known as the breadbasket of Europe.

In 2008, agriculture accounted for 8.29% of Ukraine's GDP and by 2012 had grown to 10.43% of the GDP. Agriculture accounted for $13.98 billion of value added to the economy of Ukraine in 2012. Despite being a top 10 world producer of several crops such as wheat and corn Ukraine still only ranks 24 out of 112 nations measured in terms of overall agricultural production.

Ukraine is the world's largest producer of sunflower oil, a major global producer of grain and sugar, and future global player on meat and dairy markets. It is one of the largest producers of nuts. Ukraine produces more natural honey than any other European country and is one of the world's largest honey producers. An estimated 1.5% of its population is involved in honey production, therefore Ukraine has the highest honey per capita production rate in the world. Because Ukraine possesses 30% of the world's richest black soil, its agricultural industry has a huge potential. Farmland remains the only major asset in Ukraine that is not privatized.

The agricultural industry in Ukraine is already highly profitable, with 40–60% profits, but according to analysts its outputs could still rise up to fourfold. Ukraine is the world's 6th largest, 5th if not including the EU as a separate state, producer of corn in the world and the 3rd largest corn exporter in the world. In 2012 Ukraine signed a contract with China, the world's largest importer of corn, to supply China with 3 million tonnes of corn annually at market price. The deal included a $3 billion line of credit extension from China to Ukraine.

In 2014, Ukraine's total grain crop was estimated to be a record 64 million metric tons. In 2014, Ukraine lost de facto control over portions of several regions after those regions declared independence from Ukraine, resulting in the war in Donbas and the Crimea Crisis, hence the actual available crop yield was closer to 60.5 million metric tons. Due to the decline of the metallurgy industry, Ukraine's prior top export category, as a result of the war in Donbas agricultural products accounted for Ukraine's largest export category.

In March 2020, Ukraine's parliament lifted a ban on the sale of farmland. The land market was fully opened for the first time independence on 1 July 2021.

Ukraine also produces some wine, mostly in the South-Western regions.

In 2018:
 It was the 5th largest world producer of maize, after the US, China, Brazil and Argentina;
 It was the 8th largest world producer of wheat;
 It was the 3rd largest world producer of potato, second only to China and India;
 It was the world's largest producer of sunflower seed;
 It was the 7th largest world producer of sugar beet, which is used to produce sugar and ethanol;
 It was the 7th largest world producer of barley;
 It was the 7th largest world producer of rapeseed;
 It was the 13th largest world producer of tomatoes;
 It was the 5th largest world producer of cabbage, after China, India, South Korea and Russia;
 It was the 11th largest world producer of apple;
 It was the 3rd largest world producer of pumpkin, second only to China and India;
 It was the 6th largest world producer of cucumber;
 It was the 5th largest world producer of carrot, after China, Uzbekistan, USA and Russia;
 It was the 4th largest world producer of dry peas, second only to Canada, Russia and China;
 It was the 7th largest world producer of rye;
 It was the 3rd largest world producer of buckwheat, second only to China and Russia;
 It was the 6th largest world producer of walnuts;
 Produced  of soy;
 It produced  of onion;
 Produced  of grape;
 It produced  of oats;
 Produced  of watermelon;
 Produced  of cherries;

In addition to smaller productions of other agricultural products.

Professionalized, scientific breeding of barley began in 1910 and now supplies improved cultivars to the country.

Information technology

Ukraine has a long-standing reputation as a major technology region, with a well-developed scientific and educational base.
In March 2013 Ukraine ranks fourth in the world in number of certified IT professionals after the United States, India and Russia. On top of that, the experts recognize both quantitative and qualitative potential of the Ukrainian specialists. In 2011 the number of IT specialists working in the industry reached 25,000 people with 20% growth. The volume of the Ukrainian IT market in 2013 was estimated to be up to 3.6 billion US dollars.

In 2017 Ukraine emerged as the top outsourcing destination of the year, according to the Global Sourcing Association. By 2017, there were 13 research and development centers of global companies located in Ukraine, including Ericsson Ukraine, in Lviv.

As for 2019 the number of IT specialists involved in the IT industry of Ukraine reached 172,000 people. The share of IT industry in Ukraine's GDP is 4%.

According to the IT sector report 2019 Ukraine is the largest exporter of IT services in Europe and ranks among the 25 most attractive countries for software development worldwide.

Infrastructure

Maritime

About 100,000 Ukrainians regularly work on foreign merchant ships, one of the largest group of Ukrainian labor migrants and the sixth largest number of sailors from any country. They are attracted by the high salaries of more than $1,000 per month.

Every major Ukrainian coastal city has a maritime university.

Communications

Ukraine ranks eighth among the world's nations in terms of the Internet speed with the average download speed of 1,190 kbit/s. Five national providers of fixed (DSL, ADSL, XDSL) internet access — Ukrtelecom, Vega Telecom, Datagroup, Ukrnet, Volia, and 5 national operators of mobile internet – MTS, Kyivstar, PEOPLEnet, Utel, and Intertelecom are currently operating in Ukraine. Every regional center and large district center has a number of local providers and home networks.

2011 revenues from Internet service providing in Ukraine reached ₴ 4.75 bn

Over 16 million Ukrainians had Internet access in 2012, growing to 22 million in 2015. In Kyiv 90% of the population had internet access.

The mobile-cellular telephone system's expansion has slowed, largely due to saturation of the market which has reached 144 mobile phone subscriptions per 100 people.

Tourism

In 2012, Ukraine was the 8th most popular tourism destination in Europe with 23 million visitors. The country's tourism industry is generally considered to be underdeveloped, but it does provide crucial support for Ukraine's economy. In 2012, the contribution of tourism to the GDP amounted to 28.8 billion ₴, or 2.2% of GDP and directly supported 351,500 jobs (1.7% of total employment).

Shopping tourism
Ukraine's neighbours (Poles, Slovaks, Hungarians, Belarusians and even Russians) are known to come to Ukraine to purchase products and presents, such as food or gasoline, that are cheaper in Ukraine than in their home countries.

Recreational tourism and sightseeing
Ukraine has impressive landscapes, ruins of ancient castles, historical parks, vineyards where they produce native wines, unique structures such as Saint Sophia Cathedral or Chersonesos. Officially, there are seven World Heritage Sites in Ukraine. The Carpathian Mountains suitable for skiing, hiking, fishing and hunting. Bukovel — is the largest ski resort in Ukraine situated in the Ivano-Frankivsk Oblast (province) of western Ukraine. The 2010–2011 winter season recorded 1,200,000-day visits with foreigners amounting to 8–10% of all visitors. In 2012 the Bukovel was named the fastest growing ski resort worldwide.
The coastline on the Black Sea is a popular summer destination for vacationers, especially Odessa.

Financing, banking, investments

Investments

A political crisis in the middle of 2006 was feared as a threat to economic and investment stability, however, despite the forecasts, the political situation has not scared investors. The GDP showed a good growth rate of 7% in 2007, compared to the previous year. Industrial output has increased. Car sales soared, while the banking sector has expanded, thanks to the arrival of European banks.

International financial institutions

In 1992, Ukraine became a member of the IMF and the World Bank. It is a member of the European Bank for Reconstruction and Development.

In 2008, the country joined World Trade Organization. Ukraine applied for WTO membership in 1993, but its accession process was stalled for 15 years.

Foreign direct investment
Ukraine encourages foreign trade and investment. The Parliament of Ukraine has approved a foreign investment law allowing foreigners to purchase businesses and property, to repatriate revenue and profits, and to receive compensation if the property is nationalized by a future government. However, complex laws and regulations, poor corporate governance, weak enforcement of contract law by courts, and corruption all continue to stymie direct large-scale foreign investment in Ukraine. While there is a functioning stock market, the lack of protection of shareholders' rights severely restricts portfolio investment activities.

As of April 2011 total foreign direct investment stock in Ukraine stood at $44.7 billion. Statistics from FDi Magazine show Ukraine suffered a year on year decline in foreign direct investment between 2010 and 2013.

State enterprise InvestUkraine was created under the State Agency for Investment and National Projects (National Projects) to serve as a One Stop Shop for investors and to deliver investment consulting services.

Ukraine signed a shale gas exploration deal with Royal Dutch Shell on 25 January 2013. The $10 billion deal was the largest foreign direct investment ever for Ukraine.

Many companies, owned by foreigners, have been successfully operating in Ukraine since its independence. These include companies in agriculture, such as Kyiv-Atlantic Group, founded in 1994 by David Sweere. He sold its business in Minnesota and invested in Ukraine, believing in its huge potential. The company has been operating at a profit since 2002. As a result, he became the fifth richest among the Westerners who made their fortune in Ukraine.

In 2016, foreign direct investment in Ukraine's economy amounted to $3.8 billion in 2016, which was almost twice more than in 2015.

Monetary policy and banking

Stock exchange

Insurance business and companies

Legal environment and economic support

Background 
Since the late 1990s, the government has pledged to reduce the number of government agencies, streamline the regulatory process, create a legal environment to encourage entrepreneurs, and enact a comprehensive tax overhaul.

In 2003 the International Monetary Fund encouraged Ukraine to quicken the pace and scope of reforms and threatened to withdraw financial support.

On 24 June 2010, Ukraine's Foreign Minister Kostyantyn Hryshchenko signed an agreement on free trade with the European Free Trade Association (EFTA).

According to the Global Competitiveness Report 2012–2013 "the country's most important challenge is the needed overhaul of its institutional framework, which cannot be relied on because it suffers from red tape, lack of transparency, and favoritism".

In reports by Kyiv Post in 2010 and 2011 respectively, a "double taxation avoidance" treaty with Cyprus signed in 1982 by the Soviet Union has cost Ukraine billions of US dollars of tax revenues.

The 2014 Lustration in Ukraine has been criticized as it might have adverse economic effects.

On 29 May 2014 Ukraine entered into the European Union–Ukraine Association Agreement, that reached its full application on 1 September 2017.

Foreign workers
A number of foreign guest workers come to work in Ukraine, mainly in seasonal farm work and construction industry, especially from neighboring Moldova and Belarus.

Environmental issues

Ukraine is interested in cooperating on regional environmental issues. Conservation of natural resources is a stated high priority, although implementation suffers from a lack of financial resources. Ukraine established its first nature preserve, Askania-Nova, in 1921 and has programs to breed endangered species.

Ukraine has a Ministry of Environment and has introduced a pollution fee system that levies taxes on air and water emissions and solid waste disposal. The resulting revenues are channelled to environmental protection activities, but enforcement of this pollution fee system is lax. Industrial pollution is a considerable problem in Ukraine.

Chernobyl 
Significant environmental problems result from the Chernobyl nuclear power plant disaster in 1986. In accordance with its previously announced plans, Ukraine permanently closed the Chernobyl Atomic Energy Station in December 2000. In November 2001, Ukraine withdrew an application it had made to the EBRD for funding to complete two new reactor units to compensate for the energy once produced by Chernobyl. Ukrainian concern over reform conditions attached to the loan – particularly tariff increases needed to ensure loan repayment—led the Ukrainian government to withdraw the application on the day the EBRD Board was to have considered final approval.

Major Ukrainian companies 

 1+1 Media Group – media
 4AGames – Technology
 Antonov – Industrials
 APEKS-BANK – Financials
 ATB-Market –  Consumer Services
 BG Capital – Financials
 Bogdan group – Industrials
 Chumak – Consumer goods
 Ciklum – IT
 DTEK – Oil & Gaz, Basic Materials, Utilities
 EKTA – Technology
 Electron - Industrials 
 Epicentre K – Consumer services
 ESTA Holding – Financials
 FED – Aerospace industry
 Ferreexpo – Basic Materials
 FOM-Ukraine – Industrials
 Fozzy Group – Consumer services
 Galnaftogaz – Oil & Gas
 GSC Game World – Technology
 Hromadske.ua – Media
 Industrial Union of Donbas – Industrials
 InvestUkraine – Industrials
 Kryukiv Railway Car Building Works - Industrials 
 Kyivstar – Telecommunications
 Kuznya na Rybalskomu – Shipbuilding, arms industry
 Lifecell – Telecommunications
 METRO Cash&Carry – Consumer services
 MHP – Consumer goods
 Motor Sich – Industrials
 Nemiroff – Consumer goods
 Naftogaz – Oil & Gas
 Nibulon – Agriculture & Shipbuilding
 Obolon – Consumer goods
 Oschadbank – banking
 PrivatBank – banking
 Roshen – Consumer goods
 SCM Holdings – Financials
 SoftServe – IT
 Ukraine International Airlines – Consumer services
 Ukrainian Automobile Corporation –  Consumer goods
 Ukrainian Railways – Consumer services, Industrials
 Ukrnafta – Oil & Gas
 Ukroboronprom
 Ukrtelecom – Telecommunications
 Vodafone Ukraine – Telecommunications
 WOG – Oil & Gas, Consumer services
 Pivdenmash – Industrials
 Zaporizhstal – Basic materials
 ZAZ – Consumer goods

Facts and figures

Household income or consumption by percentage share:
 lowest 10%: 3.4% (2006)
 highest 10%: 25.7% (2006)

Poverty rate: 4% in 2018 (below US$5.5/day).

Industrial production growth rate:
6% (2007 est.), 6.5 (2008)

Electricity:
 production: 192.1 billion kWh (2006)
 consumption: 181.9 billion kWh (2006)
 export: 10.07 billion kWh (2005)
 import: 20 billion kWh (2006)

Electricity – production by source:
 fossil fuel: 48.6%
 hydro: 7.9%
 nuclear: 43.5%
 other: 0% (2001)

Oil:
 production:  (2006)
 consumption:  (2006)
 exports:  (2004)
 imports:  (2004)
 proved reserves:  (1 January 2006 est.)

Natural gas:
 production: 20.85 billion cubic m (2006 est.)
 consumption: 73.94 billion cubic m (2006 est.)
 exports: 4 billion cubic m (2006 est.)
 imports: 57.09 billion cubic m (2006 est.)
 proved reserves: 1.075 trillion cubic m (1 January 2006 est.)

Agriculture – exports:
grain, sugar beets, sunflower seeds, vegetables, beef, milk, natural Honey.

Agriculture – imports:
seafood, pork, beef, grain

Exchange rates:
hryvnia per US$1 – 22 (2015), 7.97 (2009), 5.05 (2007), 5.05 (2006), 5.13 (2005), 5.33 (May 2004), 5.30 (October 2002), 5.59 (February 2000), 5.3811 (January 2000), 4.1304 (1999), 2.4495 (1998), 1.8617 (1997), 1.8295 (1996), 1.4731 (1995)

Minimum wage:
₴6,000/ ~$210 per month (from 2021 to 2001-01)

Average salary by region

See also
 The World Bank in Ukraine
 Tourism in Ukraine
 List of Ukrainian administrative divisions by GRP per capita
 List of Ukrainian subdivisions by GRP
 Ukraine's industrial complex

Notes

References

External links
 Ministry of Economic Development and Trade
 State Agency for Investment and National Projects website (en)
 How to go broke owning monopolies by Kyiv Post (18 March 2010)
 World Bank Summary Trade Statistics Ukraine 2012
 Growth Strategy of Ukraine's Economy

 

Ukraine